"Rock On" is a song written by English singer David Essex. Recorded in 1973 and released as a single by Essex, it became an international hit. In 1989, American actor and singer Michael Damian recorded a cover version that went to number one on the Billboard Hot 100 chart. The song has been recorded many times, including a 2006 version by the English hard rock group Def Leppard.

David Essex version

Background and release
The song, written and recorded by David Essex, was released in August 1973 in the UK, and reached its highest position of number 3 in the UK Singles Chart in September that year. It spent 11 weeks in the UK charts. In March 1974, Essex's version reached number one in Canada on the RPM national Top Singles chart and was a top-ten hit (reaching number 5) on the U.S. Billboard Hot 100 pop music chart. It was Essex's only Billboard top 40 song. "Rock On" was the title track of Essex's 1973 debut studio album, and was also featured on the soundtrack album of the 1973 film That'll Be the Day (as well as being played over the closing credits of the film's U.S. release) in which he had a starring role. The song is still frequently played on classic rock and oldies radio stations.

Essex later re-recorded the song in 1988 with an updated lyric. This version, which was remixed by Shep Pettibone, appeared on Essex's 1989 album Touching the Ghost. A single release of the updated version reached number 93 on the UK Singles Chart.

Arrangement and context
The song features a slow-tempo vocal performance in C# minor, along with a minimalist, rhythm-driven instrumental accompaniment to Essex's vocal performance. The lyric pays homage to early rock-and-roll and its surrounding youth subculture, and notably to 1950s rebel James Dean (although the lyrics refer to him as "Jimmy Dean", which is the name of the country-western singer famous for Big Bad John), but James Dean's name is spoken before the instrumental as well. This song makes reference to "Blue Suede Shoes" by Carl Perkins, and "Summertime Blues" by Eddie Cochran.

The distinctive stripped-back musical arrangement was devised by producer Jeff Wayne after hearing Essex's original vocal demo:

"'Rock On' was demonstrated to me in the studio after finishing the jingle session. And the way David demoed it for me was he went into the studio, our engineer put on a microphone and David picked up a trashcan and started banging out this little rhythm, so there was no instruments. Because there was no instruments, the engineer put on this sort of repeat echo, and it gave an atmosphere to it, and that's what I then went away to work on. I went away and thought about the song and the attractiveness was the hollows, the absences and the mood in the lyrics as well. And so I had this idea that there would nothing on it that played a chord, so that's why there's no keyboards, there's no guitars, there's nothing that plays a chord."

"When David wrote 'Rock On', it was the type of song that from my point of view as an arranger and producer gave me much more adventurous ideas, a concept of sound. A ballad is a ballad, whereas 'Rock On' allowed us to be a bit more off-the-wall. It was a gamble and a bit of a fight to get it through. But both David and I felt that 'Rock On' was a career-breaking record, whereas a ballad would give him a shorter-term success, it wouldn't distinguish him."

According to Wayne, only three session musicians played on the final backing track, and the most prominently featured was veteran session musician Herbie Flowers, whose double-tracked bass guitar was treated with a prominent "slapback" delay effect, creating a complex polyrhythmic backbeat:

"I can recall the three musicians on the backing track for 'Rock On' all looking around in a mostly empty Advision Studios, Studio 1, wanting to know when the rest of the band were arriving! I explained there weren't any others for that track, and I was relying on them to understand my idea for the production. While the drums and percussion parts were written out, it was definitely Herbie that grasped immediately that a bass guitar playing a lead riff could fill a large part of the spatial spectrum and he took my idea and turned some basic notes of mine, into his amazing bass riff. Then to top it off, he suggested playing it again an octave higher. So you get this unusual bass sound right up front – now it couldn't have been up front if the arrangement didn't allow the air and the space to be created that way."

Flowers himself noted that, as a reward for devising the double-tracked bass line, he was paid double his normal session fee, and thus received £24 instead of the usual £12. He had earlier created a similar double-tracked bass line for Lou Reed's "Walk on the Wild Side", explaining in a BBC Radio 4 interview that it had also been done because he would be paid double.

Chart history

Michael Damian version

Background and release
"Rock On" was covered by soap opera star and singer Michael Damian in 1989, and featured in the teen film Dream a Little Dream, starring Corey Haim and Corey Feldman among others. Damian's version, which he also released from his independent album Where Do We Go From Here on the Cypress Records label, was a harder-edged interpretation that employed none of the vocal or instrumental distortion in the original 1973 David Essex version.

Reception
"Rock On" became Damian's first hit in eight years, since his 1981 cover of Eric Carmen's song "She Did It". His rendition became a gold record. It reached the number one position on the Billboard Hot 100 chart, thus outperforming Essex's original Billboard ranking. However, the song did get to number one for Essex in 1974 on the US Cashbox Top 100, in the same week it was at number 11 on the Billboard charts. In addition, Haim, Feldman, and Meredith Salenger all appeared in Damian's music video for the song. This version was ranked number 99 on VH1's 100 Greatest One Hit Wonders of the 80s (despite the fact that Damian actually had four Billboard-charting singles during the 1980s).

Chart history

Def Leppard version

English hard rock band Def Leppard began playing the song on their 2005 tour in support of their compilation album Rock of Ages: The Definitive Collection along with a cover of Badfinger's "No Matter What" which appeared on the album.  The band released a studio recording of the song as a digital single in May 2006 preceding the release of their album Yeah!, which features cover versions of 1970s rock hits. The single spent 18 weeks on the US Hard Rock chart, peaking at No. 18 in June 2006. The song has since become a staple in Def Leppard's setlists, often following a Rick Savage's bass solo. "We took that one to pieces and rewrote it…" observed Joe Elliott. "American radio still plays 'Rock On' every day, sandwiched between Lynyrd Skynyrd and Zeppelin." The radio remix version of the song also appeared on Def Leppard's 2018 compilation album The Story So Far – The Best Of.

See also
 List of 1970s one-hit wonders in the United States

References

External links
Lyrics to this song at Genius

1973 singles
1974 singles
1989 singles
David Essex songs
Michael Damian songs
Def Leppard songs
Billboard Hot 100 number-one singles
Cashbox number-one singles
Songs written by David Essex
RPM Top Singles number-one singles
1973 songs
Columbia Records singles
Mercury Records singles
A&M Records singles
Song recordings produced by Jeff Wayne
Glam rock songs